Phkoam is a khum (commune) of Svay Chek District in Banteay Meanchey Province in north-western Cambodia.

Villages

 Phkoam
 Yeang Vien
 Yeang
 Ampil
 Ou
 Prasat Vien
 Ta Duol
 Svay Sa
 Mau
 Thma Koul
 Ta Kul

References

Communes of Banteay Meanchey province
Svay Chek District